This is a list of joint premiers of the Province of Canada in order of time served in office as joint premier, both as premier and as deputy.  This list counts time during an election campaign as belonging to the preceding premier.  When adding together days in non-consecutive terms, a month is taken to mean 30 days.

Sir John A. Macdonald: 9 years, 0 months, 27 days
William Draper: 5 years, 0 months, 25 days
Robert Baldwin: 4 years, 9 months, 18 days
Sir Louis-Hippolyte Lafontaine: 4 years, 9 months, 18 days
Sir George-Étienne Cartier: 4 years, 5 months, 25 days
Sir Étienne-Paschal Taché: 3 years, 11 months, 30 days
Augustin-Norbert Morin: 3 years, 2 months, 30 days
Sir Francis Hincks: 2 years, 11 months, 14 days
Denis-Benjamin Viger: 2 years, 6 months, 5 days
John Sandfield Macdonald: 2 years, 0 months, 6 days
Sir Narcisse-Fortunat Belleau: 1 year, 11 months
Denis-Benjamin Papineau: 1 year, 8 months, 23 days
Sir Allan Napier MacNab: 1 year, 8 months, 13 days
Antoine-Aimé Dorion: 1 year, 0 months, 19 days
Louis-Victor Sicotte: 11 months, 21 days
Samuel Harrison: 11 months, 7 days
Henry Sherwood: 9 months, 12 days
Charles Richard Ogden: 8 months, 2 days
George Brown: 4 days

Canada, Joint Premiers